Satiricosissimo is a 1970 Italian comedy film directed by Mariano Laurenti starring the comic duo Franco and Ciccio. It is a parody of the 1969 Federico Fellini film Fellini Satyricon.

Plot summary 
Ciccio loves very much the novel Satyricon of Petronius Arbiter, although his friend Franco does not understand him. Ciccio also saw the famous Federico Fellini's film about the novel, and he goes with Franco in a country inn, near Rome. The director, seeing the success of the film by Fellini, does furnish the inn in the fashion of ancient Rome. Even the guests and the waiters are dressed to the ancient, and so do Franco and Ciccio, but they break a jar of wine and are hunted. The two fall asleep in a clearing, and wake up in the Rome of the Emperor Nero.

Franco and Ciccio risk being killed, and so they're saved just by writer Petronius who hire them as servants. Petronius is the best adviser to Nero, who is scared because he believes that his mother Agrippina wants to kill him. Franco and Ciccio therefore must watch over the life of the emperor, but they soon discover that the killer who wants to murder Nero is not the mother.

Cast 

 Franco Franchi as  Franco
 Ciccio Ingrassia as  Ciccio
 Edwige Fenech as  Poppaea Sabina 
  Giancarlo Badessi  as  Nero
 Arturo Dominici as Tigellinus
 Karin Schubert as  Acte
 Pino Ferrara as  Petronius
 Linda Sini as  Agrippina the Younger
 Leonardo Severini as  Seneca
 Gigi Reder as The Innkeeper 
 Ignazio Leone as  The Judge 
 Samson Burke as  Taurus

References

External links

Satiricosissimo at Variety Distribution

1970 films
Films directed by Mariano Laurenti
Films scored by Carlo Rustichelli
Films set in ancient Rome
Films set in the Roman Empire
Films set in the 1st century
Depictions of Nero on film
Italian buddy comedy films
1970s buddy comedy films
1970 comedy films
Federico Fellini
Satyricon
1970s Italian films